Barbie in the Nutcracker is a 2001 computer-animated fantasy film co-produced by Mainframe Entertainment and Mattel Entertainment, and distributed by Artisan Home Entertainment. 

Loosely adapted from E. T. A. Hoffmann's 1816 short story, "The Nutcracker and the Mouse King", and featuring music based from Tchaikovsky's 1892 ballet, The Nutcracker, it marked the character's first film since the 1987 television specials; Barbie and the Rockers: Out of This World and Barbie and the Sensations: Rockin' Back to Earth, with Kelly Sheridan providing the voice of Barbie. and was also the first Barbie movie to be computer-animated.

Barbie in the Nutcracker premiered on VHS on October 2, 2001 by Artisan, followed up with a DVD release a few weeks later on October 23rd. before being subsequently released overseas through Entertainment Rights and Universal Pictures Video. The film sold more than 3.4million units on DVD by 2002, and grossed  in total sales. It won the Video Premiere Award for Best Animated Video Premiere Movie.

Plot
The story is told by Barbie to her younger sister, Kelly, who is having trouble rehearsing a ballet solo and fears going onstage.

A girl named Clara lives with Drosselmeyer, her stern grandfather, and Tommy, her younger brother. On Christmas Eve, they receive a surprise visit from their Aunt Elizabeth. Clara receives a Nutcracker from her aunt who claims it contains the heart of a prince. Clara falls asleep by the Christmas tree and awakens to see her Nutcracker suddenly alive and fighting an army of mice led by the wicked Mouse King. The Mouse King shrinks her down to his size, though he is unable to defeat them and temporarily retreats.

The Nutcracker explains that he needs to find the Sugarplum Princess, the only person who can defeat the Mouse King's magic. The wise owl of the grandfather clock reveals that the Sugarplum Princess is also the only one who can make Clara her original size again. The owl gives Clara a locket from an ornament figurine that will send her back home when she opens it.

Through a portal in a mouse hole, The Nutcracker and Clara land in an ice cave. They escape with the help of a group of snow fairies and enter the Nutcracker's home of Parthenia. The two journey to a gingerbread village, where they meet two children and the horse Marzipan. The children tell them that the rightful heir to the throne, Prince Eric, has gone missing. The group narrowly escapes the Mouse King's army when they are saved by Major Mint and Captain Candy, who lead a small group of villagers in hiding. Mint reveals that Prince Eric's careless attitude led the former king to pronounce the Mouse as temporary ruler until Eric accepted his responsibilities. Clara realizes that the Nutcracker is the missing Prince Eric; when the Mouse decided he wanted to be king permanently, he turned Eric into a Nutcracker. Eric hopes to redeem himself and make things right again.

Clara and the Nutcracker, joined by Mint and Candy, set off on a journey to reach the Sugarplum Princess. While Mint and Candy prepare a boat, Clara and Nutcracker manage to free a group of flower fairies who had been trapped in a well by the Mouse King. The group is suddenly attacked by a rock giant, sent by the Mouse King to stop them from reaching the Princess. The snow fairies arrive and freeze the sea, followed by Marzipan pulling a sled, allowing the group to cross. The Nutcracker uses his sword to crack the ice, causing the rock giant to sink into the sea.

The group reaches the Princess's island, but it is revealed to be a trap and the Nutcracker, Mint, and Candy are caged and carried off by the Mouse King's bat henchman Pimm, leaving Clara behind. The flower fairies help carry Clara off the island and to the Mouse King's castle where she frees her friends. The Nutcracker battles with the Mouse King who has his own spell reflected back at him, shrinking him to the size of a real mouse and causing him to flee. The Nutcracker is severely injured and Clara kisses him whereupon he is restored to his true form as Eric. Clara, because she was able to break the spell and save her friends, is revealed herself to be the Sugarplum Princess. Eric is crowned king and the couple, who have fallen in love, dance as the citizens celebrate. The shrunken Mouse King returns riding on Pimm's back, snatches Clara's locket and opens it, but is knocked out of the sky with a snowball. Clara disappears and is magically transported home.

Clara wakes up where she fell asleep. The Nutcracker is missing, and she runs to her grandfather, who dismisses the story as her imagination. Just then, Aunt Elizabeth returns with a young man who is revealed to be Eric, whom she introduces to Clara. Eric asks her to dance. A snow globe shows Prince Eric and the Sugarplum Princess dancing happily in the palace.

As the story ends, Kelly realizes the importance of not giving up, and she and Barbie finally manage to dance the solo perfectly.

Voice cast

Production
Barbie in the Nutcracker was choreographed by the New York City Ballet master-in-chief Peter Martins. The film's music, based on Tchaikovsky's score for The Nutcracker, was performed by the London Symphony Orchestra. The film's ballet sequences feature the movement of New York City Ballet dancers computer animated through motion capture imaging.

The film was animated over four months by 22 artists at Mainframe Entertainment, using Softimage and Maya for some of the visual effects. All the non-human characters were keyframed, while the humans were motion-captured with the Motion Analysis system (including Filmbox and Eva software) to achieve a rotoscopic look. The animators spent one week working with the New York City Ballet at Acclaim Motion Capture Studio in Long Island, taking three days to motion-capture the dancers.

According to Jennifer Twiner McCarron, CGI producer at Mainframe and a co-producer on the film, Mattel wanted a "very soft and stylized look" for Barbie, and did not want the character to appear or move like a doll, as she had in her brief appearance in Toy Story 2. McCarron stated, "We did lots of lighting tests and lots of lighting and hair shader development. We used Eddie, a softer add-on that gets around the blurriness." One animator's job was dedicated to animating the movement of Barbie's hair. McCarron stated, "[Barbie's] hair is always down on her neck, not braided like [Princess Fiona] in Shrek, so we had to keep it down. A hair rig was built so that when she moved it wouldn't intersect with her. Her hair was like a separate character, what with all the attention and care it received."

Sound post-production was done at Vitello Productions in Hollywood.

New York City Ballet dancers
 Charles Askegard (Prince Eric)
 Maria Kowroski (Barbie/Clara)
 Benjamin Millepied
 Nora Y. Mullman
 Abi Stafford
 Yue Nhice Fraile with the dancing princess

Release

United States
Barbie in the Nutcracker was released on VHS on October 2, 2001, and DVD on October 23, 2001, by Artisan Home Entertainment under the Family Home Entertainment banner. The film was televised on CBS in the United States on November 22, 2001, edited down to a one-hour special. It was later broadcast on Nickelodeon on March 21, 2004. 

The DVD includes both wide-screen and pan-and-scan versions of the movie. Bonus features on the DVD include a documentary following several girls training to be ballet dancers as the School of American Ballet in New York, and an "Act with Barbie" feature teaching children about positive role playing.

The movie was re-released on DVD by Universal Studios Home Entertainment on October 5, 2010.

International
In February 2001, Entertainment Rights acquired all international TV and home video rights to the film from Mattel for £1.6 million.

The film was released onto VHS in the United Kingdom by Right Entertainment/Universal Pictures Video on October 29, 2001, being the first product released by the then-new subsidiary. The film would become a commercial success in the UK, selling 100,000 units within its first week of release. It was released on DVD on March 25, 2002, and by April, 700,000 copies were sold across both formats.

Entertainment Rights sublicensed the home video rights outside the United Kingdom and Ireland to Universal Pictures Visual Programming in July 2001 as part of a deal that would allow Universal to distribute Right Entertainment products in the UK and Ireland. ER would also pre-sell the TV rights in countries like Germany, France, Italy, Hong Kong, South Korea and Australia by May 2003.

Reception

Commercial reception
Barbie in the Nutcracker had a 94% sell-through rate and sales of over 3.5 million units on video and DVD. It grossed US  in total sales, including associated merchandise. It was the second most popular children's video of 2001 in the United States.

Critical response
Barbie in the Nutcracker holds a score of 20% on review aggregator site Rotten Tomatoes, based on 5 critic reviews.

Caryn James of The New York Times wrote, "the film works well enough according to the undemanding rules of Barbie. With its adventures in fairyland and magical transformations, this is a diverting, inoffensively sweet tale for very small children." Marylin Moss of The Hollywood Reporter praised the film as wholesome entertainment for young girls, writing "Barbie is all gentle and generous and not afraid of a villain or two. The story is strong, the animation splendid and the music and choreography delightful. The entire production is first-rate." A review in Parenting noted the film "explores how self-confidence and kindness can enable girls to realize their dreams".

Peter Dobrin of The Philadelphia Inquirer called Barbie in the Nutcracker a "smart effort" with a "compelling story". R. Pitman of The Video Librarian wrote, "the colorful animation, kid-friendly script, and excellent "highlights" score [...] all make for pleasant family viewing, and the fairy dances (clearly inspired by sequences in Peter Pan and Fantasia) truly sparkle." Calling the film "a perfect dream", Remi Sklar of Video Store Magazine noted educational benefits to children from the classical music and ballet, and wrote that the battle scenes and male characters could make the film appealing to young boys as well as girls.

Rating it 4 out of 5 stars, Rob Lowing of the Sunday Age called it "unexpectedly charming." Scott Hettrick of the South Florida Sun-Sentinel praised the film's story, voice cast and ballet performances, and wrote, "It's hard to imagine any other 76-minute program, let alone any other version of The Nutcracker, that delivers as much adventure, fantasy, romance, humor, suspense, ballet and classical music." Marc D. Allan of the Indianapolis Star rated it 3 stars and called it "extremely impressive". Entertainment Weekly reviewer Eileen Clarke awarded the film a grade of "B Minus", writing that it did not feature as much ballet as she expected.

Other critics were less positive. Joe Leydon of Variety called it a "generic fantasy-adventure", observing similarities to The Wizard of Oz, and wrote, "Pre-adolescent girls may be charmed by sugary sweetness of "Barbie in the Nutcracker." But they shouldn't expect their parents, or even slightly older siblings, to join them for repeated viewings of this made-for-video trifle." While enjoying the "few amusing lines and clever situations", Robert Gottlieb of The New York Observer did not like the film's animation, describing the characters' appearance as "semi-rigid celluloid aliens with glazed expressions and enamel smiles". Jennifer Fisher of The Los Angeles Times felt that the story had been "tamper[ed] too much with", opining that Barbie in the Nutcracker "stray[s] so far from any previous "Nutcracker" story that she might as well have remade "The Wizard of Oz" or called it "Rebecca of Sunnybrook Candy Land.""

Reviewing the film for Common Sense Media, Joly Herman deemed it a "lackluster holiday tale", finding that Clara is a more passive heroine than those in later Barbie movies: "She helps the Nutcracker with some of his tasks, and she stands up to the Mouse King in a scary confrontation, but she's more interested in being the romantic link than the heroic one."

Awards
Video Premiere Award for Best Animated Video Premiere Movie — Won (Producers Jesyca C. Durchin and Jennifer Twiner McCarron)
Video Premiere Award for Best Character Performance — Nominated (Barbie/Clara: voice actress Kelly Sheridan, animation directors Michael Ferraro and Gino Nichele)
Video Premiere Award for Best Character Performance — Nominated (Pimm: voice actor Peter Kelamis and animator Chris Buckley)

Merchandise
Barbie in the Nutcracker had an extensive product tie-in campaign. Products included a book, eight dolls, a Hallmark Christmas ornament, ballet bags and sleepwear. The toy line included Barbie as Clara/the Sugarplum Princess, Ken as Prince Eric, Kelly and Tommy as their feature characters, and a horse and candy sleigh. The Barbie as Clara and Ken as Prince Eric dolls were available in both Caucasian and African-American models.

See also
List of films featuring miniature people
 List of Christmas films

References

External links
Barbie in the Nutcracker at the Universal Pictures Home Entertainment portal

2001 direct-to-video films
Nutcracker
2001 computer-animated films
Films using motion capture
Films set in the 2000s
2000s English-language films
American fantasy adventure films
Animated films based on children's books
Animated Christmas films
Films based on The Nutcracker and the Mouse King
Artisan Entertainment films
Films about size change
2000s American animated films
American direct-to-video films
American independent films
Canadian direct-to-video films
Canadian independent films
American children's animated adventure films
American children's animated fantasy films
American Christmas films
Canadian animated fantasy films
Canadian animated feature films
Canadian Christmas films
Canadian fantasy adventure films
2000s children's animated films
2000s children's fantasy films
Films set in the 1810s
Films set in Russia
Films set in the Russian Empire
Films set in a fictional country
2000s Christmas films
2001 films
Films directed by Owen Hurley
2000s Canadian films